Chryseobacterium endophyticum  is a Gram-negative, aerobic and endophytic bacteria from the genus of Chryseobacterium which has been isolated from a leaf of a maize plant.

References

External links
Type strain of Chryseobacterium endophyticum at BacDive -  the Bacterial Diversity Metadatabase

endophyticum
Bacteria described in 2017